95th Street is a major east–west highway on Chicago's South Side and in the southwest suburbs, designated as 9500 South in Chicago's address system. 95th Street is  south of Madison Street.

Route description
95th Street begins at IL 171 (Archer Avenue) in Willow Springs west of the Des Plaines River. in Palos Township and runs through Spears Woods Forest Preserve. Just before exiting the forest preserve, it intersects La Grange Road (US 12/US 20/US 45). US 12 and 20 turn onto 95th Street, making it a much bigger road. Route 45 continues south on La Grange Road. Continuing east, 95th Street crosses major interstate and state routes, including: Interstate 294 (Tri-State Tollway, Harlem Avenue (Illinois Route 43), Cicero Avenue (Illinois Route 50), Pulaski Road, Kedzie Avenue, Halsted Street (Illinois Route 1). At State Street, 95th crosses Interstate 94 (the Dan Ryan Expressway). It is just south of 95th that Interstate 57 ends at I-94. Continuing east, 95th Street crosses Interstate 90 (Chicago Skyway), the Calumet River, before ending at Ewing Avenue/Avenue L (US 41) on Lake Michigan.

Communities and sites
In the city of Chicago, 95th Street passes through the neighborhoods of Beverly, Washington Heights and Roseland, then marks the borders between Burnside and Pullman and between Calumet Heights and South Deering before crossing the Calumet River to enter the East Side neighborhood. Chicago State University is located on 95th Street between Cottage Grove and King Drive.

In Naperville, Illinois, there is one high school on 95th Street. Neuqua Valley High School is a public high school in Indian Prairie School District 204.

Transportation
Taking into account its entire length, 95th Street is the longest east–west road on Chicago's South Side, and is served by a number of trains and buses (75th Street is longer as a whole, but has its majority in DuPage County rather than Chicago and Cook County.) The 95th/Dan Ryan terminal of the Red Line is one of the busiest in the system. It is a transfer point for people living on the far south side or in the suburbs. The CTA 95 95th and Pace 381 buses run along 95th Street. Additionally, the 29 State, 34 South Michigan, 100 Jeffery Manor Express, 103 West 103rd, 106 East 103rd, 108 Halsted/95th, 111 111th/King Drive, 112 Vincennes/111th, 115 Pullman/115th, and 119 Michigan/119th buses, as well as the Pace 352 Halsted, 353 95th/Dan Ryan CTA/Calumet City/Homewood, 359 Robbins/South Kedzie Avenue, and 395 95th/Dan Ryan CTA/UPS Hodgkins buses, start and end at 95th/Dan Ryan station. A number of Metra lines cross 95th Street, including: two stops on the Rock Island District line at 95th Street–Longwood and 95th Street - Beverly Hills, the Electric Main and Blue Island Lines at 95th Street (Chicago State University), and the SouthWest Service line at Oak Lawn. The South Shore Line (NICTD) also crosses 95th Street at the Metra Electric Station but does not stop there.

Movie history
The 95th Street bridge over the Little Calumet River is the one used for the "Draw Bridge Jump" scene in Blues Brothers at the beginning of the film.

Major intersections

References

External links

Streets in Chicago
U.S. Route 12
U.S. Route 20